Zygocarpum dhofarense is a species of flowering plant in the family Fabaceae. It is found in Oman and Yemen. It is threatened by habitat loss.

References

Dalbergieae
Flora of Oman
Flora of Yemen
Vulnerable plants
Taxonomy articles created by Polbot
Taxobox binomials not recognized by IUCN